Zevgolateio  is a town in the municipality Velo-Vocha, Corinthia, Greece. It is located 82 kilometers west of Athens. In 2011, the town had a population of 4,697. It is the seat of the municipality.

References

Populated places in Corinthia